Maurice Ignatius "Moss" Keane (27 July 1948 – 5 October 2010) was a Gaelic footballer and a rugby union footballer who played for Ireland and the British and Irish Lions.

Life and career
Born at Currow in County Kerry, Keane started out as a Gaelic footballer, playing at college level for University College Cork and in the process winning a number of medals including three Sigerson Cups, one Cork County Championship and a Munster Club Championship, he also played in an All Ireland Club Final. He represented Kerry Gaelic footballer's at U-21 and Junior level as a full back, winning Munster Championships at both levels, playing in an All Ireland at Junior level. In 2011 the Kerry County Board named the cup for the winners of the Intermediate Shield after him.

He then found rugby through a friend in college, playing for the UCC junior rugby team as 'Moss Fenton', during the Gaelic Athletic Association (GAA)'s ban on foreign games. When asked what he first thought about rugby he answered: "It was like watching a pornographic movie – very frustrating for those watching and only enjoyable for those participating."
He made his international debut for Ireland on 19 January 1974 against France in Paris, a game Ireland lost 9–6 in the 1974 Five Nations Championship.

Keane became the third Irish forward after Willie John McBride and Fergus Slattery to reach 50 international appearances. He scored his one and only test try in a 22–15 victory over Scotland in February 1980.

He played his 51st and final international against Scotland on 3 March 1984 in Dublin. Ireland lost the match 32–9.

Keane was also a part of the famous Munster side that defeated the All Blacks in Thomond Park in 1978.

He toured New Zealand with Phil Bennett's British and Irish Lions in 1977, making one Test appearance, and was also a key man in Ireland's 1982 Five Nations Championship win and their historic Triple Crown victory in 1982.

Outside sport 
Having gained a master's degree in dairy science, Keane worked for the Department of Agriculture during his rugby playing career and retired in July 2010. He kept active playing golf on a weekly basis.  In 1993 he was the victim of a vicious mugging.

In 2005 he wrote, with Billy Keane (no kin), his autobiography, called Rucks, Mauls and Gaelic Football.

Illness and death
In 2009 it was reported that Keane was being treated for bowel cancer. He died aged 62 on 5 October 2010. Many tributes were made including Taoiseach Brian Cowen saying "one of the great gentleman of Irish sport, would be sadly missed by his many fans and admirers worldwide, Moss Keane was one of the finest rugby players Ireland has ever produced, He was among rugby's best known characters and a legend of the game at home and abroad".

The IRFU paid tribute to Keane, describing him as one of Irish rugby's "most genuine characters and legends of the game", "Moss had ability on the field that no one could doubt from his record at club, provincial and international level, " IRFU President Caleb Powell said, "UCC, Lansdowne, Munster, Ireland and the British & Irish Lions all benefited from his presence and ensured that his reputation will live long in the memories of not only Irish rugby, but world rugby."
Keane is survived by his wife Anne and his two daughters Sarah and Anne Marie. His funeral took place on 7 October in St Michael's Church  Portarlington. Former Ireland international players, including Willie John McBride, Ollie Campbell, Tony Ward, Mick Galwey, Dick Spring, Donal Lenihan, Donal Spring and Ciaran Fitzgerald were in attendance. Keane's coffin was adorned with the jerseys of Ireland, Munster, UCC, Kerry and Currow.

Honours

Ireland

Five Nations Championship:
Winner (2): 1974, 1982Triple Crown:Winner (1): 1982

References

External links
 Career statistics from Irish Rugby
 Moss Keane's career in photos. BBC Sport.
 Moss Keane: A Rugby Life In Pictures
 Daily Telegraph Obituary

1948 births
2010 deaths
Kerry inter-county Gaelic footballers
Currow Gaelic footballers
UCC Gaelic footballers
Irish rugby union players
Ireland international rugby union players
Lansdowne Football Club players
University College Cork RFC players
Munster Rugby players
British & Irish Lions rugby union players from Ireland
Deaths from colorectal cancer
Gaelic footballers who switched code
Rugby union players from County Kerry
Rugby union locks